Oreolais is a genus of birds in the family Cisticolidae. It contains species that were previously placed in the genus Apalis.

The genus consists of two species:
 Black-collared apalis, Oreolais pulcher
 Rwenzori apalis, Oreolais ruwenzorii

References

 
Bird genera